Antun Barac (Kamenjak, 20 August 1894 – Zagreb, 1 November 1955), was a Croatian historian.

Biography
Barac graduated at the Faculty of philosophy at the University of Zagreb in 1917, and received his Ph.D. as a high school professor on Sušak in 1918, with the thesis on Vladimir Nazor's poetry.  Since 1930 he is a regular professor at the Faculty of Philosophy in Zagreb. He was accepted as a regular member of Yugoslav Academy of Sciences and Arts in 1947.

He edited numerous scientific editions and anthologies, and has written high school handbooks together with Nazor. He served as a prorector of the University of Zagreb after his rectorship mandate expired (1950–1951). He was a significant contributor to modern Croatian literary theory, especially in the position of Croatian literature in the European context. He published numerous monographies on top Croatian artists such as Nazor, Šenoa, Vidrić or Mažuranić, a number of critic-essayist writings on lesser known writers, as well as great syntheses on Croatian literary criticism of the 19th century, and the unfinished history of Croatian literature from Croatian National Revival to the time of creation of Yugoslavia.

A square in Novi Zagreb is named after him.

Literary criticism
Barac's valorisation of literature is based on the two tenets: the literature has to be an expression of a man in his totality, as an individual and social being, deeply covering the basic aspects of life. His other tenet is that the great art is born only out of the great pain.

His studies were permeated by a specific national criterion, holding that every little literature to a more or less extent reflects the social life of its people, as opposed to the large national literature. This view is reflected in his well-known maxim on the greatness of the small.

References

  Antun Barac, University of Zagreb webpage

1894 births
1955 deaths
Rectors of the University of Zagreb
20th-century Croatian historians
Croatian writers
Members of the Croatian Academy of Sciences and Arts
Burials at Mirogoj Cemetery
Yugoslav historians